The Osceola News-Gazette is a weekly newspaper based in Osceola County, Florida. Its print version is published on Thursdays out of its main editorial office in Kissimmee. Its website (AroundOsceola.com) was overhauled in August 2019. The publication's focus is on the county's government, schools and high school sports teams as well as features on local residents.

References

Newspapers published in Florida
Osceola County, Florida